Théodore Jean Arcand, LL.D. (born June 25, 1934 in Bonnyville, Alberta, Canada, died April 16, 2005, in Montreal, Quebec, Canada) was a Canadian former diplomat. He was Chargé d'Affaires a.i. to Holy See at the beginning of his career then followed by Ambassador Extraordinary and Plenipotentiary to Jordan, Lebanon and Syria concurrently. This was followed by a diplomatic appointments to Hungary and Denmark. He was later named again to the Holy See. He received an honorary doctorate from McMaster University in 1995.

External links
 Foreign Affairs and International Trade Canada Complete List of Posts
 Archives Canada information (French)
 Obituary, Ottawa Citizen

1934 births
People from the Municipal District of Bonnyville No. 87
Ambassadors of Canada to Syria
Ambassadors of Canada to the Holy See
Ambassadors of Canada to Jordan
Ambassadors of Canada to Lebanon
Ambassadors of Canada to Hungary
2005 deaths